The Speaker of the National Assembly is the presiding officer of the unicameral Parliament of Botswana. Since Botswana's independence from the United Kingdom in 1965, eight men and women have served as Speaker. The first, Alfred Merriweather, a Scottish missionary and physician, served from 1965 to 1968. The current Speaker, Phandu Skelemani, has been speaker since 5 November 2019.

List of speakers

Sources
Former Speakers of Parliament, Official website of the Parliament of Botswana

Botswana
Lists of political office-holders in Botswana
National Assembly (Botswana)